Katherine Anne Legge (born 12 July 1980) is a British professional auto racing driver, competing in the IMSA SportsCar Championship.

Racing career

Early racing and Atlantics
Prior to joining the Toyota Atlantic series, Guildford-born Legge raced in several developmental open-wheel series in Britain, including Formula Three, Formula Renault and Formula Ford. In 2000, she was the first woman to achieve a pole in a Zetec race. In 2001, she beat Kimi Räikkönen's lap record and achieved a pole, and she was the first woman to receive the BRDC's "Rising Star" accolade.

Legge's move to the United States came about in 2004, when after running out of finances to continue her racing career, she visited the UK offices of Cosworth, refusing to leave until she had met Cosworth boss Kevin Kalkhoven. Kalkhoven sent his daughter to speak to Legge to get her to leave: after a brief conversation with Legge, she instead told Kalkhoven that he should meet with her. Kalkhoven then offered her a drive in the first three rounds of the 2005 Toyota Atlantic Championship with Polestar Motor Racing: this was her first full-time drive. She won the series opener at Long Beach in her first career Atlantic start. In doing so, she became the first woman to win a developmental open-wheel race in North America. Legge went on to take her second and third wins of the season at Edmonton and San Jose. She finished the season 3rd in the championship with three wins and five podiums. She also received the Toyota Atlantic BBS Rising Star 2005 Award.

In November 2005, Legge became the first woman to test a Formula One car since Sarah Fisher in 2002, when she tested on the second and third days (22 and 23 November) of the Minardi team's final testing session at Vallelunga. After she crashed after 2 laps on her first run on the track, it was decided to postpone the test until the following day, on which she completed 27 laps with a best lap time of 1:21.176. She was also the first woman to test an A1 Grand Prix car, on 9–11 December 2005 with A1 Team Great Britain.

She received the 2005 RACER Magazine "Most Promising Road Racer of The Year" award, a title that had been awarded every year since 2002 to A. J. Allmendinger. Other recipients include Räikkönen, Jenson Button, Cristiano da Matta, Alex Barron, Giancarlo Fisichella, Greg Moore, and Gil de Ferran.

Champ Car
In the 2005–2006 off-season, Legge tested a Champ Car once for Rocketsports Racing and twice for PKV Racing. In February 2006, it was announced that she would drive for PKV Racing in the 2006 Champ Car season. In June, she became the first woman to lead a lap in series history, leading 12 laps at Milwaukee. Legge suffered a violent accident at the 2006 Grand Prix of Road America when the rear wing of her car broke; she was able to walk away from the car unharmed.

Legge drove for Dale Coyne Racing in 2007, and her best result in the series was sixth place, twice.

DTM

In 2008, Legge moved to the Deutsche Tourenwagen Masters series, driving for Colin Kolles' Futurecom TME Audi team. For 2009 and 2010 she raced for the Abt Sportsline team, who were the 2008 champions. For 2009 she was the only one of the 5 drivers in the Abt Sportline team using the previous year's car.

Return to the US
In January 2012, Legge signed with Dragon Racing in the IndyCar Series, alongside Frenchman Sébastien Bourdais. Legge reached a two-year agreement with sponsor TrueCar as part of their Women Empowered campaign. However, since the Lotus engines were shown to be uncompetitive, the team made a change to Chevrolet engines. But team owner Jay Penske could only procure one Chevrolet engine lease agreement for the team, so they could only enter one car per race after Indianapolis. Therefore, for the remainder of 2012, Dragon entered Bourdais at the road and street courses, and Legge at oval tracks, except for Sonoma Raceway where both drivers were able to compete. Legge finished 26th in points, competing in ten of the 15 races, and had a best finish of ninth in the 2012 MAVTV 500 IndyCar World Championships at Auto Club Speedway.

In 2013, Legge left IndyCar to join the DeltaWing program in the United SportsCar Championship. Legge competed in the 2014 and 2015 seasons for DeltaWing.

In May 2015, Legge announced her involvement with the Grace Autosport project to enter the 2016 Indianapolis 500 race. Working with the support of the FIA's Women in Motorsport Commission, the all-female team set out to promote technology and engineering as a career for young women.

Legge joined Michael Shank Racing in 2017 to drive an Acura NSX GT3 at the IMSA SportsCar Championship. In the 2019 24 Hours of Daytona Legge raced as part of an all-female team alongside Simona de Silvestro, Christina Nielsen and Ana Beatriz, having placed second in class the previous year. She was placed 15th in their class after Legge brushed a wall and damaged the car's suspension.

Formula E
Legge signed for the Amlin Aguri team to compete in the inaugural season of the Formula E electric open-wheel series. She raced in the first two races before being dropped for Salvador Durán.

European Le Mans Series
In July 2020, while participating in the pre race testing at Paul Ricard ahead of the European Le Mans Series, Legge was injured in a crash suffering a broken wrist and leg. Legge was part of the all-female Richard Mille Racing team along with Sophia Florsch and Tatiana Calderón.

NASCAR

In August 2018, Legge joined JD Motorsports for her NASCAR Xfinity Series debut at Mid-Ohio Sports Car Course, driving the No. 15 Chevrolet Camaro. As part of a two-race schedule with the team, she also competed at Road America. Legge later made her oval debut at Richmond Raceway.

Personal life
Legge is a member of the Women in Motorsport Commission of the FiA (Federation Internationale de l'Automobile).

She was briefly engaged to German racing driver Peter Terting.

Motorsports career results

Complete American open-wheel racing results
(key)

Atlantic Championship

 ** Podium (Non-win) indicates 2nd or 3rd place finishes.
 *** Top 10s (Non-podium) indicates 4th through 10th place finishes.

Champ Car

 ** Podium (Non-win) indicates 2nd or 3rd place finishes.
 *** Top 10s (Non-podium) indicates 4th through 10th place finishes.

IndyCar Series

 ** Podium (Non-win) indicates 2nd or 3rd place finishes.
 *** Top 10s (Non-podium) indicates 4th through 10th place finishes.

Indianapolis 500

Complete A1 Grand Prix results
(key)

Complete Deutsche Tourenwagen Masters results
(key) (Races in italics indicate fastest lap)

† — Retired, but was classified as she completed 90% of the winner's race distance.

Complete Formula E results
(key) (Races in bold indicate pole position; races in italics indicate fastest lap)

Complete IMSA SportsCar Championship results
(key) (Races in bold indicate pole position) (Races in italics indicate fastest lap)

† Points only counted towards the WeatherTech Sprint Cup and not the overall GTD Championship.

24 Hours of Daytona results

Complete FIA World Endurance Championship results
(key) (Races in bold indicate pole position) (Races in italics indicate fastest lap)

NASCAR
(key) (Bold – Pole position awarded by qualifying time. Italics – Pole position earned by points standings or practice time. * – Most laps led.)

Xfinity Series

 Season still in progress
 Ineligible for series points

References

External links

 
 
 

1980 births
Living people
Sportspeople from Guildford
English expatriates in the United States
English racing drivers
Formula Ford drivers
British Formula Renault 2.0 drivers
British Formula Three Championship drivers
24 Hours of Daytona drivers
Indianapolis 500 drivers
IndyCar Series drivers
Female IndyCar Series drivers
Champ Car drivers
NASCAR drivers
Atlantic Championship drivers
Deutsche Tourenwagen Masters drivers
WeatherTech SportsCar Championship drivers
Formula E drivers
English female racing drivers
Team Aguri drivers
FIA World Endurance Championship drivers
Meyer Shank Racing drivers
A1 Grand Prix drivers
A1 Team Great Britain drivers
Abt Sportsline drivers
Team Rosberg drivers
Kolles Racing drivers
Dragon Racing drivers
Arrow McLaren SP drivers
KV Racing Technology drivers
Dale Coyne Racing drivers
Motaworld Racing drivers
Rahal Letterman Lanigan Racing drivers
Audi Sport drivers
Fortec Motorsport drivers
Iron Lynx drivers
Racing drivers' wives and girlfriends